Stepchildren of Society is a Swedish NGO founded in 2004 for the benefit of adults who were placed in orphanages and foster homes by the state as children. 
Stepchildren of Society has three main areas of focus:
 reciprocal support among all stepchildren of society
 redress to those who were abused or neglected within the state's child care
 surveillance of today’s child custody policies.
Stepchildren of Society co-operated with the 2006 state inquiry reviewing abuse and negligence within the social authorities’ childcare. 
The activities of the association are built upon democratic values and human rights according to the Swedish constitution, the Convention on the Rights of the Child, the Universal Declaration of Human Rights, and the European Convention on Human Rights.
Since 2008 the organization publishes a news letter, "Styvbarnen informerar". The current president is Robert Wahlström, since 2014.

References

External links
 Stepchildren of Society’s website

Child-related organizations in Sweden
Human rights organizations based in Sweden